The Liberty Movement of Cameroon Youth was a political party in Cameroon led by Dieudonné Tina.

History
The party contested the May 1997 parliamentary elections, receiving 0.4% of the vote and winning a single seat. It supported incumbent President Paul Biya in the October 1997 presidential elections.

The party lost its seat in the 2002 elections, shortly after which a split led to a group leaving the party to establish the Movement for the Liberation and Development of Cameroon.

References

Defunct political parties in Cameroon
Political parties with year of establishment missing
Political parties with year of disestablishment missing